Paula García may refer to:
 Paula García (tennis)
 Paula García (footballer)
 Paula García Ávila, Spanish handballer